Enneking is a surname. Notable people with the surname include:

John Joseph Enneking (1841–1916), American painter
Mike Enneking (born 1962), American soccer player 
William F. Enneking (1926–2014), American orthopaedic oncologist

Surnames of German origin